Payradanga is a village in the Ranaghat I CD block in the Ranaghat subdivision of the Nadia district of West Bengal, India.

History 
The  history of Payradanga includes history of places like Pritinagar, Anulia, Baidyapur and Haradham. These villages are inter-connected by roads. In 1606 A.D. Bhabananda Roy Majumder was the King of Nadia according to the Mughal Empire Jahangir's 14 Parganas. Later on Raja Rudra (1683–94) established the city Krishnanagar. However, the development in Nadia was led by Raja Krishnachandra (1728–82). He built religious places and small localities around different places in Nadia. He also built a locality at Haradham (currently in Payradanga) and Anandadham. During the 1950s some social workers like Khitish Chandra Guha, Rohonikanta Das, and Bhabes Chandra Chakroborty developed a locality in Pritinagar. They built a co-operative to support the project. They established the Pritinagar Bhudeb Smriti Vidyapith in 1950. Various cultural clubs in and around Pritinagar were also set up during that time.

The first structured ruling system employed in Payradanga was the Chowkidary Panchayat system that started in 1870 during the British period. In 1885 this two-level ruling structure was formed by the British Government. Post-independence, the ruling scheme was similar. In 1957 the first Panchayat structure was employed in West Bengal, but in 1973 the law was passed and a 3-stage panchayet was employed, i.e. Zilla Parishad, Panchayet Samiti and Gram Panchayat. The 1st Gram Panchayat election was held in June 1978.

Geography

Location

Payradanga is not identified as a separate inhabited place in 2011 census. According to the map of Ranaghat I CD block in the District Census Handbook 2011, Nadia, Payradanga appears to be spread across Ukhil Nara mouza and Parbbatipur census town. Payradanga railway station is shown as being located in Parbbatipur.

Area overview
Nadia district is mostly alluvial plains lying to the east of Hooghly River, locally known as Bhagirathi. The alluvial plains are cut across by such distributaries as Jalangi, Churni and Ichhamati. With these rivers getting silted up, floods are a recurring feature. The Ranaghat subdivision has the Bhagirathi on the west, with Purba Bardhaman and Hooghly districts lying across the river. Topographically, Ranaghat subdivision is spread across the Krishnanagar-Santipur Plain, which occupies the central part of the district, and the Ranaghat-Chakdaha Plain, the low-lying area found in the south-eastern part of the district. The Churni separates the two plains. A portion of the east forms the boundary with Bangladesh. The lower portion of the east is covered by a portion of the North 24 Parganas district. The subdivision has achieved reasonably high urbanisation. 41.68% of the population lives in urban areas and 58.32% lives in rural areas.

Note: The map alongside presents some of the notable locations in the subdivision. All places marked in the map are linked in the larger full screen map. All the four subdivisions are presented with maps on the same scale – the size of the maps vary as per the area of the subdivision.

Transport 
Payradanga railway station is well connected by the local train transport system to the Sealdah-Ranaghat Line.
as well as Ghatigacha Bus Stop on NH12.

Education
Pritinagar Bhudeb Smriti Vidyapith (H.S) and Pritinagar Bhudeb Smriti Vidyapith for girls are the two Bengali-medium schools, established in 1950 and 1960 respectively. Pritinagar Bhudeb Smriti Vidyapith (H.S) has a library with 1,100 books and a large playground.

References

Villages in Nadia district